Tectonics are the processes that control the structure and properties of the Earth's crust and its evolution through time. These include the processes of mountain building, the growth and behavior of the strong, old cores of continents known as cratons, and the ways in which the relatively rigid plates that constitute the Earth's outer shell interact with each other. Tectonics also provide a framework for understanding the earthquake and volcanic belts that directly affect much of the global population. 

Tectonic studies are important as guides for economic geologists searching for fossil fuels and ore deposits of metallic and nonmetallic resources. An understanding of tectonic principles is essential to geomorphologists to explain erosion patterns and other Earth surface features.

Main types of tectonic regime

Extensional tectonics

Extensional tectonics is associated with the stretching and thinning of the crust or the lithosphere. This type of tectonics is found at divergent plate boundaries, in continental rifts, during and after a period of continental collision caused by the lateral spreading of the thickened crust formed, at releasing bends in strike-slip faults, in back-arc basins, and on the continental end of passive margin sequences where a detachment layer is present.

Thrust (contractional) tectonics

Thrust tectonics is associated with the shortening and thickening of the crust, or the lithosphere. This type of tectonics is found at zones of continental collision, at restraining bends in strike-slip faults, and at the oceanward part of passive margin sequences where a detachment layer is present.

Strike-slip tectonics

Strike-slip tectonics is associated with the relative lateral movement of parts of the crust or the lithosphere. This type of tectonics is found along oceanic and continental transform faults which connect offset segments of mid-ocean ridges. Strike-slip tectonics also occurs at lateral offsets in extensional and thrust fault systems. In areas involved with plate collisions strike-slip deformation occurs in the over-riding plate in zones of oblique collision and accommodates deformation in the foreland to a collisional belt.

Plate tectonics

In plate tectonics, the outermost part of the Earth known as the lithosphere (the crust and uppermost mantle) act as a single mechanical layer. The lithosphere is divided into separate "plates" that move relative to each other on the underlying, relatively weak asthenosphere in a process ultimately driven by the continuous loss of heat from the Earth's interior. There are three main types of plate boundaries: divergent, where plates move apart from each other and new lithosphere is formed in the process of sea-floor spreading; transform, where plates slide past each other, and convergent, where plates converge and lithosphere is "consumed" by the process of subduction. Convergent and transform boundaries are responsible for most of the world's major (Mw > 7) earthquakes. Convergent and divergent boundaries are also the site of most of the world's volcanoes, such as around the Pacific Ring of Fire. Most of the deformation in the lithosphere is related to the interaction between plates at or near plate boundaries.

Other fields of tectonic studies

Salt tectonics

Salt tectonics is concerned with the structural geometries and deformation processes associated with the presence of significant thicknesses of rock salt within a sequence of rocks. This is due both to the low density of salt, which does not increase with burial, and its low strength.

Neotectonics

Neotectonics is the study of the motions and deformations of the Earth's crust (geological and geomorphological processes) that are current or recent in geological time. The term may also refer to the motions and deformations themselves. The corresponding time frame is referred to as the neotectonic period. Accordingly, the preceding time is referred to as palaeotectonic period.

Tectonophysics

Tectonophysics is the study of the physical processes associated with deformation of the crust and mantle from the scale of individual mineral grains up to that of tectonic plates.

Seismotectonics

Seismotectonics is the study of the relationship between earthquakes, active tectonics, and individual faults in a region. It seeks to understand which faults are responsible for seismic activity in an area by analysing a combination of regional tectonics, recent instrumentally recorded events, accounts of historical earthquakes, and geomorphological evidence. This information can then be used to quantify the seismic hazard of an area.

Impact tectonics
Impact tectonics is the study of modification of the lithosphere through high velocity impact cratering events.

Planetary tectonics
Techniques used in the analysis of tectonics on Earth have also been applied to the study of the planets and their moons.

See also

 Tectonophysics
 Seismology
 UNESCO world heritage site Glarus Thrust
 Volcanology
Mohorovičić discontinuity

References

Further reading
 Edward A. Keller (2001) Active Tectonics: Earthquakes, Uplift, and Landscape Prentice Hall; 2nd edition, 
 Stanley A. Schumm, Jean F. Dumont and John M. Holbrook (2002) Active Tectonics and Alluvial Rivers, Cambridge University Press; Reprint edition,

External links
 The Origin and the Mechanics of the Forces Responsible for Tectonic Plate Movements
 The Paleomap Project